Phasia obesa is a species of 'parasitic flies' belonging to the family Tachinidae subfamily Phasiinae.

Distribution
This fly is present across the palaearctic ecozone,  in most of Europe, in Israel, in Iran, in Russia, in China and in Japan.

Description

Their large compound eyes are reddish. Antenna, including arista, are black. The body is greyish, with four longitudinal black bands interspersed with clear bands of the same thickness on mesonotum. The side  of thorax  shows black setae. The abdomen is black. The large wings show a light brownish shading. The cell R5 is closed at the edge. Basicostae are  black. In the males eyes are separated by a  distance  narrower  than the ocellar  triangle.

Biology
Adults can mostly be encountered from June through September feeding on nectar of flowers (especially of Asteraceae species).

Larvae of Phasia obesa are parasitoids on adults or nymphs of various species of plant bugs (Neottiglossa sp. and  Zicrona caerulea Pentatomidae, Leptopterna dolabrata and  Beosus  maritimus Miridae,  Lygus pratensis,  Lygus rugulipennis Lygaeidae,  Myrmus miriformis Rhopalidae, etc.).

Bibliography
 James E. O'Hara, Hiroshi Shima, & Chuntian Zhang - "Annotated Catalogue of the Tachinidae (Insecta: Diptera) of China" - Zootaxa 2190 (2009): 1-236
 Birgitta Rmerta; Sven Hellqvistb; Mette Kjbek Petersen - A survey of Lygus parasitoids in Sweden - Biocontrol Science and Technology, Volume 15, Issue 4, 2005, Pages 411 - 426

References

External links
 Biolib
 Eol.org

Phasiinae
Insects described in 1798
Diptera of Europe